Flight 670 may refer to two aircraft crashes:

 Aerolineas Argentinas Flight 670 (1957, Argentina) — a DC-4 was flown into extreme weather
 Atlantic Airways Flight 670 (2006, Norway) — spoilers on a BAe 146 failed

0670